Manuel Augusto Pinho Godinho (born 1 August 1985), simply known as Godinho is a Portuguese professional footballer who plays for A.D. Sanjoanense as a midfielder.

Career

Sanjoanense
On 3 July 2019 A.D. Sanjoanense announced, that Godinho had joined the club from UD Oliveirense.

References

External links 
 
 

1985 births
Living people
People from Oliveira de Azeméis
Association football midfielders
Portuguese footballers
U.D. Oliveirense players
Associação Naval 1º de Maio players
C.D. Santa Clara players
A.D. Sanjoanense players
Liga Portugal 2 players
Primeira Liga players
Sportspeople from Aveiro District